Eric Pateman is a Canadian chef and entrepreneur. Pateman owned and operated the Edible Canada brand of companies which included a restaurant, retail store(s) and a culinary travel division until its closure in 2021. He is also the Executive Chef and President at Sea to Sky Seasonings, which produces the Amola salt line. He provides culinary consulting services to public and private sector businesses around the world through his consulting arm, ESP Culinary Consulting.

Pateman is best known for his work in Canadian food and wine including writing the framework for Canada’s national culinary tourism strategy, provincial culinary tourism strategies as well as conducting research projects, running culinary festivals, providing cooking demonstrations, as well as hosting events and doing public speaking engagements. When Pateman is not working, he is at home in the mountain town of Squamish or hanging out in Whistler, British Columbia.

Education 
Pateman attended Dubrulle Culinary School, studying in the Hotel and Restaurant Management Program. He then completed his MBA in Hotel Finance at Oxford Brooks University, in Oxford, UK with his published thesis focusing on the impact of the Olympics on hotels and restaurants in host cities. Since that time he has worked as an Executive Chef and Hospitality Consultant in North America, the UK, the United States, Australia, New Zealand and Africa.

Businesses 
ESP Culinary Consulting is a culinary consulting firm founded in 2016. It provides support for both the public and private sector of the culinary, hospitality and tourism industries, specializing in culinary tourism development, marketing & branding and strategic operational development.

Sea to Sky Seasonings is an artisan salt and seasoning company founded in 2010. Amola is the rebranded salt division and was established in 2013.

Edible Canada was a culinary tourism business founded in 2006 on Granville Island in Vancouver, British Columbia. Founded as Edible Vancouver, the company soon became known as Edible British Columbia upon moving to Granville Island, and was then eventually renamed Edible Canada in 2010. The business included a bistro and retail store on Granville Island, as well as multiple satellite stores including White Rock, Whistler, Kelowna and Oliver, BC, and offered tours and culinary events across Canada and around the world. Edible Canada was included at 183rd place in the 2014 PROFIT Top 500, which ranks Canada's fastest growing companies. Edible Canada closed during the COVID-19 pandemic in 2020, and the business was sold in 2021.

Culinary tourism projects 
Pateman works on culinary tourism projects in Canada and other countries around the world. International clients include: Italy, Australia, New Zealand, Turtle Island (in Fiji), the UK and more. Forbes has called him "the tastemaker who's defining countries' entire culinary tourism strategies."

Within Canada, he has worked with most of the provinces and territories, notably as the Yukon’s Culinary Brand Ambassador and Manager of the Tourism Conference and Strategy, as well as the Developer of the Canadian Seafood Centre of Excellence and Innovation. Some of his other projects have included: Canada’s National Culinary Tourism Framework and British Columbia's Culinary Tourism Strategy.

In 2020, he was engaged by Accent Inns to create a restaurant for their newest Hotel Zed location in Tofino, BC. The resulting project, Roar, is focused on seafood and live fire cooking, and is scheduled to open in May 2021.

Presentations 
Pateman has spoken on topics concerning culinary tourism, food and beverage strategies and Canadian cuisine in general. In April 2018, Pateman took part in Australia's first tourism conference, presenting on How To Use Food To Drive Destination Visitation. Pateman spoke as an industry leader on the development of culinary tourism. Other speaking engagements include:

 Pure Life Experiences Conference in Marrakech in Morocco in 2017
 United Nation’s World Travel Organization’s Forum on Gastronomy Tourism in San Sebastian, Spain in 2017
 Worldchefs Congress, Russia
 Global Table, Australia
 Seafood Expo Asia Reconnect
 SITE Canada Education Day
 Fairmont Canadian Historical Dinner Series
 Children’s Wish Gala
 GFS Western Conferences (Kelowna and Victoria)
 Terra Madre Salone del Gusto, Italy
 Yukon Culinary Festival
 BC Hospitality Conference
 Food3000 Conference

Pateman has also presented as an expert guest speaker on "How Canadians Communicate About Food" in Banff, Alberta.

Honors and awards 
In 2013, Pateman was awarded the Mayor of Vancouver's Arts Awards for Culinary Arts. In 2018, Pateman was nominated by the Royal Canadian Geographical Society (RCGS) as its newest Fellow. Pateman is the first chef who has ever been nominated a Fellow of RGCS, the acknowledgement is awarded to distinguished individuals who not only excel in their fields but do so while promoting Canadian geographical and cultural knowledge to audiences throughout the globe.

He has also received the following awards:

• Tourism Association of Canada Culinary Tourism Award - Flight Across the Top of Canada

• Mayor of Vancouver Art Awards - Culinary Arts

• Top 40 Foodies Under 40

• Business in Vancouver Top 40 Under 40

Publications 
• How Canadians Communicate VI: Food Promotion, Consumption, and Controversy
• British Columbia Seasonal Cookbook 2nd Edition
• British Columbia Seasonal Cookbook 1st Edition
• Olympic Dreams: Assessing the Potential Impact of the 2010 Winter Olympic Games on Greater Vancouver's Hotel Industry

References

External links 
 Edible Canada
 Amola
 Eric Pateman is pairing Top Cuisine with Luxury Travel in a way that brings new Flavor to Adventurers - Swagger Magazine
 Working Whisky Weekend in Whitehorse - PBS 
 Across the Top of Canada - Canada Explore 
 Across the Top of Canada 2017 
 Eric Pateman Island Highlights 
 Eric Pateman of Edible Canada speaks at Thought4Food hosted by Copia
 The Catalysts - Eric Pateman | Lincoln
 The Travelling Palate 
 Qualicum Beach Scallops with Chorizo, Chillwack Creamed Corn, and Heirloom Tomato Salsa
 Spot Prawn Ceviche 
 Edible Canada’s Across the Top – Pan Roasted Arctic Char

Canadian male chefs
Canadian food writers
Living people
Year of birth missing (living people)